Look Back Library (LBL) is a non-profit organization dedicated to preserving the history of skateboard magazines, and other printed skateboard materials, through traveling exhibits and the building of publicly accessible skateboard magazine libraries.

Mission 
As a "Skate Mag Preservation Society" the Look Back Library aims to promote literacy and the appreciation of printed skateboard materials, particularly magazines. The LBL engages in community outreach through exhibits of classic skate magazines; as well as, installing skate magazine libraries at local Skate shops and other venues.

History 
Founded by Kevin Marks in 2014, the Look Back Library originated from a pet project of Marks' to improve the skate magazine library at Launch, a community skate organization located in Fort Collins, Colorado. While improving the library at Launch, he noticed considerable interest from both readers and collectors. Marks conceived of the Look Back Library as a way to place the magazine duplicates he was accumulating into a space where the public could read them. The Look Back HQ is located in San Diego, CA, with Marks spending a good portion of the year traveling and installing libraries.

41 Years of the Ollie
In 2019, Look Back Library travelled around the United States, touring a show titled 41 Years of the Ollie - a magazine cover exhibit exploring the history of the ollie.

Libraries

California 
 Slappy's Garage - San Diego
Look Back HQ - San Diego, CA*
 Local Skate Shop - Lakeside
 The House Skate Shop - Vista
 Handplant - Laguna Beach
 Socal Skate Shop - Mission Viejo
 Focus Board Shop - Lake Forest
 Joker's Skate Shop - Huntington
 Next Up Foundation - Anaheim
 Contenders Boardshop - Orange
 Long Beach Skate - Long Beach, CA
 Transitions - Carson, CA
 Apt Skate Shop - Torrance, CA
 3043 Board Shop - South Gate, CA
 South Bay Skates - Torrance, CA
 Unmodern Industries - Santa Fe Springs, CA
 The Garage Board Shop - Los Angeles, CA
Six Stair - Los Angeles, CA*
 Overcast Skate Shop - Temecula, CA
 Kingswell - Los Angeles, CA
 Off Top - Los Angeles, CA
 Skate Punk Skate Shop - City of Industry, CA
 Pawn Shop Skate Co. - Covina, CA
 Crooks Skate Shop - Riverside, CA
 Skateboarding Hall of Fame - Simi Valley, CA
 Lighthouse Skate Shop - Santa Barbara, CA
 Impact Skate Shop - Bakersfield, CA
 Skate Works - Los Altos, CA
 Red Curbs Skate Shop - Fremont, CA
The Orchid - Goleta, CA*
 Red Curbs II - Concord, CA
 San Francisco Skate Club - San Francisco, CA
 Mission Skate Shop - San Francisco, CA
 Proof Lab - Mill Valley, CA
 Brotherhood Board Shop - Santa Rosa, CA
Street Science - Livermore, CA
Kingpin Skate Shop - San Joaquin County, CA
Woodward West  - Stallion Springs, CA*
Boulevard Skate Shop - Sacramento, CA
Hangtown Board Shop - Placerville, CA

Washington 

 Unknown Board Shop - Bellingham, WA 
 All Together Skatepark - Seattle, WA

Oregon 

 Shrunken Head Skate Shop - Portland, OR
 SOL SK8S - Bend, OR
 Windell's Camp*

Colorado 

 Launch - Community through Skateboarding - Fort Collins, CO
 Curbside skatepark -  Englewood, CO

New Mexico 

 Microwave - Albuquerque, NM

Arizona 

 Cowtown - Tempe, AZ*
Mortal Skate Shop - Tucson, AZ

Virginia

 Cardinal Skate Shop - Norfolk, VA

Pennsylvania 

 Switch & Signal Skatepark - Swissvale, PA
Ignition - Lancaster, PA 
Holistic - Reading, PA
Woodward EAST*

New York 

 Krudco -  Rochester, NY
 Jamestown Skate Products - Jamestown, NY
 KCDC - Brooklyn, NY

New Jersey 

 NJ Skate Shop 1 - Jersey City, NJ 
 NJ Skate Shop 2 - New Brunswick, NJ
 High Voltage Cafe - Asbury Park, NJ

Massachusetts 

 The Edge Indoor Skatepark - Taunton, MA

Maryland 

 Vu Skate Shop - Baltimore, MD

North Carolina 

 Backdoor Skate Shop - Greenville, NC

Georgia 

 Ruin - Dunwoody, GA

South Carolina 

 Continuum - Charleston, SC

Florida 
 The Boardr - Tampa, FL*

Texas 
 Crooks - El Paso, TX 
 AltaVista Skate Shop - San Antonio, TX 
 4Dwn skatepark - Dallas, TX 
 Deviance Skate Supply - Wichita Falls, TX
 Southside Skate Shop - Houston, TX

Oklahoma 
 Nine One Skate - Tulsa, OK

Nebraska 
 Precision Skate Shop - Lincoln, NE

Kentucky 
 Riot Skatepark - Louisville, KY

Indiana 

 Minus - Indianapolis, IN
 Rhett Skateboarding - Bloomington, IN 
 Killer Skatepark - Evansville, IN

Tennessee 

 Hunt Supply Co - Nashville, TN 
 Sixth Avenue Skatepark - Nashville, TN

Ohio 

 Tri-Star Skates - Cleveland, OH  
 Demented Skate Shop - Liberty Township, Butler County, OH

Wisconsin 

 Cream City Skatepark - Butler, WI 
 Freedom - Madison, WI

Minnesota 

 Familia HQ Skatepark - Minneapolis, MN

Illinois 

 Ground Floor Skateboards - Rockford, IL
 Fargo Skateboarding - DeKalb, IL 
 F A Skates - Prospect, IL

Kansas 

 All City Skateboarding - Wichita, KS
 River Rat Skate Shop - Lawrence, KS

Michigan 

 Plus Skateboarding - Farmington, MI

Missouri 

 Missouri Vortex aka Hermann's Hole, near Hermann, MO*
Escapist - Kansas City, MO

Canada 

 Antisocial - Vancouver, BC 
 ToplessPizza Shredquarters

Australia 
Hemley Skateboarding - Fitzroy, Victoria

Note: *libraries available by appointment only

References 

Libraries in the United States
Libraries in San Diego
Libraries in San Diego County, California
Libraries in California
Skateboarding magazines
Non-profit organizations based in San Diego
Skateboarding organizations